IKCO EF Engines (also called National Engine) are a family of four-cylinder engines by the Iranian car manufacturer Iran Khodro (IKCO). The first engines of this family (the EF7 series) were designed jointly by Iran Khodro Powertrain Company (IPCO) and F.E.V GmbH of Germany. The later models were designed by IPCO itself. IPCO is the powertrain design and production company of IKCO.

The first phase of IKCO EF Engines project (EF7 Dual-Fuel) investments were estimated at 80 million US$. IKCO aimed to supply 800,000 powertrains by 2010.

EF engines share most of their parts between them. The EF4 and EF7 are bi-fuel engines that use CNG as their main fuel and can also use gasoline. The EFD is a single-fuel engine  that uses diesel as fuel.

The EF family dual-fuel and petrol-fuel engines have achieved the Euro IV emission standard and are able to achieve Euro V emission standard with some minor changes, but EFD will be the first engine of the family which comes with the Euro IV emission standard as its first release, and is able to achieve the Euro VI emission standard with alterations.

Some prominent suppliers for EF engines are INA for sensitive variable valve timing (VVT) parts and other mechanical parts, MAHLE which supplies some mechanically integral components of the engine family such as pistons, with Bosch supplying the ECU and electrically controlled pedal and many other sensitive electronic parts. All of the parts (except high-tech and sensitive parts) from worldwide companies are produced in Iran under license with the required quality for the engines.

EF7 and EF7+

The engine general structure is similar to the PSA Group's Peugeot TU5JP4. It has displacement of 1648 cc with a bore of 78.560 mm and a stroke of 85 mm. This engine was introduced as EF7 dual-fuel in 2008 at Engine Expo Stuttgart, Germany,. It is a 16-valve engine incorporating CVVT technology on its intake valves (IPS type).

It features an advanced cooling system (both lubrication and liquid-cooling) compared to the PSA TU5JP4. The EF7 has a direct-drive oil pump. The water pump, oil pump and oil coolant system are integrated in one place to reduce removal of parts for maintenance compared to other engines. Other parts are re-engineered to provide ease in changing the oil filter.

The engines will use a Three way Catalytic Converter to reach higher emission standards.

All the EF7 variants have passed the NVH tests successfully on their head cylinder and cylinder block.
Also, the engines have a Blow-by system which does ventilation for the Crankcase and Oil Pan.

The EF7 assembly line is in Tehran, Iran.

EF7-NA (Dual-Fuel)

Reaches a maximum power of 6000 rpm and a maximum torque of 3250 rpm when using either CNG or petrol.

IKCO has indicated an engine timing belt change interval of 180,000 Km. IKCO states if the engine runs only on CNG it will not need any special maintenance until 250,000 km(average) and if the engine runs with both CNG and gasoline the number will increase to more than 250,000 km.

Due to challenges in feasibility, numerous requests for single-fuel Samand with EF7 engine and petrol-based EF7 engine not being ready, In late 2009 IKCO wanted IP-CO to start a project for removing CNG-necessary parts of the engine. Thus, the project was completed in about 3 months and the tests were completed in the second quarter of 2010. In this version of the engine, only ECU program is changed and CNG functions are disabled; This ECU program supports immobilizers too. Currently, consumers are able to purchase Samand with single-fuel EF7 engine.

In September 2010, IKCO announced the design and production of a modified EF7 engine with reduced fuel consumption and air pollution. The engine is mobilized with Direct Injection technology for both petrol and CNG.As the IPCO president says after the new engine is produced, IKCO will be the first manufacturer in the world to use the Direct Injection technology for CNG engines.

Technical details

 ECU:  ME 7.4.9NG
 Coil ignition:  P-50
 Spark plugs: FR8DE+
 Gasoline Fuel Injectors: 
 CNG Fuel Injectors: ikco
 CNG Fuel Rail: ikco
 Gasoline Fuel Rail: ikco
 Upstream Oxygen Sensor: mashad
 Downstream Oxygen Sensor: china
 TMAP Sensor: 
 Accelerator Pedal: ikco
 Recommended Fuel: Normal CNG & Unleaded Gasoline RON 95
 Recommended Engine Lubricant: 7000 Semi-Synthetic (10W-40 SL) or Behran Rakhsh 10\40
0W-40 SL)
 Timing Belt: INA
 Alternator Belt: INA
 Idlers Pulleys: INA
 HLA Tappets: INA
 Check Valve: INA
 Automatic Tensioner: INA
 CVVT Mechanism Parts: INA
 CVVT Control Valve: INA
 IPS Tensioner Valve: INA
 CVVT Closing Plug: INA
 Steel Pulley: INA
 Intake Valves: TBD
 Exhaust Valves: TBD
 Engine Starter: Valeo
 Engine Alternator: Valeo
 Flywheel: TBD
 Clutch Kit: Valeo
 Pistons: MAHLE
 Cylinder head: Continental Engine Ltd
 Intake Manifold: Continental Engine Ltd
 Engine Housings: Tara Zob Company
 Engine Mounters: TBD
 Weight: 140 kg

Parts image gallery

EF7 turbocharged (TC7)
A new variant of the EF7 family was introduced in 2009 with a turbocharger and named EF7-TC or TC7. It will be initially installed on Soren ELX and Dena plus.

To resist the high temperature of the engine combustion there will be about 35 kg of nickel used in the cylinder block alloy.

In addition, a new lubricant will produce for the engine by the company, Behran Oil.

IP-Co has estimated the engine's life cycle to be around 5 years.

EF7 petrol based

In an interview with one of the EF7 project managers, the manager confirmed the rumors of an upcoming EF7 engine.

The project of the new engine is currently in its first phases and in the end, there will be an EF7 fully compatible with gasoline.

The new engine will have many changes compared to the EF7 dual-fuel engine. Some of the changes will be: Reducing the engine compression ratio from 11:1 to 10.5:1, replacing parts that are resistant and compatible with high temperature of combustion of CNG with parts with weaker resistance to reduce production costs(New parts are fully compatible with the temperature rising from the combustion of petrol) and some other changes

In addition, the new engine will use a newer ECU program and functions

Another changed part of the engine compared to his father EF7, will be the catalytic converter. The change is due to making the engine petrol-based and there is no need to use a CNG-compatible catalytic converter for the engine.

The engine output is estimated to be between -. It depends on the company strategy, decisions and plans.

It is expected that the engine will be shown to the public in mid-2011.

EF7 Plus 
The EF7 Plus (or EF7+) series of engines reduces fuel consumption and pollution emission from Euro IV to Euro V standard.

The series include the EF7+ NA (or EF7P-NA) and the EF7+ TC (or EF7P-TC or TC7+).

Performance

 *Fuel consumption in kg for CNG

EF4

EF4 has displacement of 1397 cc with a bore of TBD mm and a stroke of TBD mm. The engine introduced to public in 2009 in Iran. It uses the EF7 cylinder head.

The engine reaches maximum power at 6000 rpm and the maximum torque at 3250 rpm for both CNG and petrol.

It shares almost all of its technologies with the big brother, EF7.

The EF4 assembly line will be in Esfahan, Iran.

The EF4 engine never made it to production or was installed in any vehicle

Performance

EFD engines

EFD diesel engines have a displacement of 1497 cc with a bore of 76 mm and a stroke of 82.5 mm.

It's a 16-valve engine featuring many new diesel engines technologies.

Because EFD engines are the first engines from the family to use an alternative fuel, this makes a necessity for changing most parts which means there are just some parts of other EF family engines used in them.

Since the initial talks about the project in mid 2008, NIOPDC was the main sponsor of the project (EFD) and has supported the project up to 20 million US$.

Iran Khodro and the company wanted to design diesel engines with the properties of being modern, technological and comparable with other new diesel engines in their range, Iran Khodro made a partnership in designing the engines and consulted with AVL in many aspects for gaining the new required technologies to reach to the goals.

IP-Co says production of the non-Turbocharged EFD engine costs about 1.7 times more than other EF family engines; but if a customer buys a car using the engine, after not a long time, these costs will be paid back to the consumers due to less fuel consumption and fewer maintenance needs.

Due to being old inefficiencies of the Peugeot BE3/5 gearbox and also a necessity for having a new gearbox for other IKCO engines, the company started to design a new gearbox that can be used for the EFD engines.The gearbox will overcome the high torques and will have more efficiency compared to the BE3/5 gearbox.On November 30, 2010, IKCO announced they will finalize the gear ratios of the new gearbox for EFD in the near future.

Here are IP-Co reasons for starting the design of a diesel engine (EFD engines):

 Respond to new territory's fuel policies and changing the domestic fuel basket from Petrol and CNG to Petrol, CNG and Diesel
 Owning an efficient diesel powertrain which is on the knowledge edges of sufficiency, fuel consumption, and pollution
 Making the Diesel engines technologies native in Iran
 Using the maximum R & D knowledge of combustion engines which is gained from designing other engines
 Designing the engines based on the EF family engines to reduce costs of development and investments

These are some of the technologies that are used in implementation of EFD engines:

 direct injection
 Common Rail with the pressure of 
 Glow plug
 Variable geometry turbocharger
 Intercooler
 Exhaust gas recirculation with cooler to increase pollution standards
 Having Euro IV Emission Standard
 Diesel Particulate Filter to remove diesel soots and particulates from exhaust gas
 Diesel Oxidation Catalyst to increase emission standard by breaking down pollutants of exhaust gas into less harmless elements.

EFD-NA 

The EFD-NA (natural aspiration) is the first variant of the EFD family, which was unveiled on November 17, 2009, by the president of Iran Mahmoud Ahmadinejad in Amol and mobilized with mentioned technologies listed above.

The engine reaches its maximum power at 4000 rpm and maximum torque at 1750 rpm.

It is currently installed on some Samands and Sorens to pass the last required tests.

Other specifications are listed in the Performance section below.

EFD turbocharged

It will be a double-stage Turbocharged engine.

IP-Co has no plan to develop it until its brother, EFD comes to the market.

Performance

See also
Automotive industry in Iran
Natural gas vehicle
Petrol engine
Internal combustion engine
Diesel engine
Turbodiesel
Diesel fuel

References

External links
 IPCO
 Iran Khodro Company
 AVL
 F.E.V GmbH

Automobile engines
Lists of automobile engines
Gasoline engines
Diesel engines
Car-related lists
Diesel engines by model
Gasoline engines by model
Diesel engines by maker
2008 introductions
Products introduced in 2008
Straight-four engines